Pasupuleti Maadhavi Latha is an Indian actress and politician who appeared in Telugu and Tamil films. She made her debut in lead role with the film Nachavule(2008). In 2018, she joined the Bharatiya Janata Party and contested from Guntur West constituency in the 2019 Andhra Pradesh Legislative Assembly election.

Early life
Madhavi Latha was born in a Telugu family in Hubli, Karnataka. Her parents are originally from Coastal Andhra. She obtained her degree from Gulbarga University, Karnataka and completed post-graduation from Mysore University.

Film career 
Maadhavi made her feature film debut with the Telugu romantic film Nachavule (2008), with a critic describing that she was promising in her role. Her next films Shh... and Snehituda... opposite Nani, opened to negative reviews and box office collections. She subsequently spent a year in the United Kingdom, pursuing a Masters qualification in Fashion Designing at Coventry University, before relocating back to Hyderabad to restart a career in films. She made a comeback and worked on films including Aravind 2 (2013) as well as on the unreleased Choodalani Cheppalani alongside Taraka Ratna, where she played a deaf and mute girl.

Her first release in 2015 was her debut Tamil film, Sundar C's multi-starrer Aambala. Madhavi has first acted in Mahesh Babu's Athidi in a role of heroine's friend.

Political career 
In 2018, Latha joined Bharatiya Janata Party. She contested from Guntur West constituency in the 2019 Andhra Pradesh Legislative Assembly election and lost, finishing at fourth place.

Personal life
In an interview with TNR, Maadhavi discussed in length her personal life and problems and struggles in her career. She also mentioned that her co-star wanted to date her during the making of her debut movie, but she declined. Her first director tried casting couch with her, and when she declined, she alleges he tried to ruin her career and could be the reason for her not getting many offers. She confessed that a person is harassing her and her family for over 10 years and she is suffering because of this.

Filmography

References

External links
 

Living people
Actresses in Telugu cinema
Actresses in Tamil cinema
21st-century Indian actresses
Indian film actresses
People from Bellary district
Actresses from Karnataka
Year of birth missing (living people)